Siah Push (also Romanized as Sīāh Pūsh and Sīāhpūsh; also known as Push) is a village in Yurchi-ye Sharqi Rural District, Kuraim District, Nir County, Ardabil Province, Iran. At the 2006 census, its population was 96, in 20 families.

References 

Towns and villages in Nir County